Arnold Karlovich Green (30 August 1920 – 4 November 2011) was a Soviet and Estonian politician and president of the Estonian Olympic Committee from 1989 to 1997, leader of the Estonian Olympic team for the Games in Albertville, Barcelona, Lillehammer and Atlanta and former President of the Estonian Wrestling League and the Estonian Skiing League.

Biography
Born to an Estonian family in Riga, Latvia, in 1920, Green served in the Soviet Army in World War II, emerging as a Soviet political functionary of the Estonian Soviet Socialist Republic in the post-war years. From 1962 to 1990 he was the Minister of Foreign Affairs of the Estonian SSR. Green participated in the organization of the 1980 Olympic Games sailing regatta in Tallinn.

In 2001 he was awarded the Olympic Order by the IOC.

Honours and awards
Five Orders of the Red Banner of Labour
Order of the Badge of Honour
Order of Friendship of Peoples
Order of the Patriotic War 1st class
Order of the Red Star
Medal "For Courage"

References

External links
  Biographical excerpt from the Olympic Review (Green's name appears as "A.K. Gren", re-transliterated from the Russian language)

1920 births
2011 deaths
20th-century Estonian politicians
21st-century Estonian politicians
Politicians from Riga
Communist Party of the Soviet Union members
Estonian referees and umpires
Ministers of Foreign Affairs of Estonia
Fourth convocation members of the Supreme Soviet of the Soviet Union
Recipients of the Medal "For Courage" (Russia)
Recipients of the Olympic Order
Recipients of the Order of Friendship of Peoples
Recipients of the Order of the Red Banner of Labour
Recipients of the Order of the Red Star
Estonian Soviet Socialist Republic people
Soviet military personnel of World War II
Soviet politicians
Burials at Rahumäe Cemetery